Amathusia is a genus of large forest butterflies with "wingtails" in the family Nymphalidae. They are known as the palmkings and the larvae feed on palms (Arecaceae). Amathusia ranges from the Andaman Islands to Sulawesi.

Species
Subgenus Amathusia
Amathusia andamanensis Fruhstorfer, 1899
Amathusia binghami Fruhstorfer, 1904
Amathusia duponti Toxopeus, 1951
Amathusia friderici Fruhstorfer, 1904
Amathusia lieftincki Toxopeus, 1951
Amathusia masina (Fruhstorfer, 1904)
Amathusia ochraceofusca Honrath, [1888]
Amathusia ochrotaenia Toxopeus, 1951
Amathusia patalena Westwood, 1848
Amathusia perakana Honrath, [1888]
Amathusia phidippus (Linnaeus, 1763)
Amathusia schoenbergi Honrath, [1888]
Amathusia taenia Fruhstorfer, 1899
Subgenus Pseudamathusia Honrath, 1886
Amathusia virgata Butler, 1870

References

External links

Images representing Amathusia at EOL

 
Nymphalidae genera
Taxa named by Johan Christian Fabricius
Amathusiini